Tang Lok Man (born 15 September 1997) is a former Hong Kong professional footballer who played as a midfielder.

References

External links
HKFA
 

1997 births
Living people
Hong Kong footballers
Association football midfielders
Hong Kong Rangers FC players
Dreams Sports Club players
Hong Kong Premier League players
Hong Kong First Division League players